Escavada Wash is a tributary of the Chaco Wash, in Chaco Canyon, New Mexico, United States. It flows south and west from its origin near Lybrook and meets the Chaco Wash at the west end of the canyon. Several small Ancestral Puebloan archeological sites border the wash, which is located north of the Chacoan great house Pueblo Alto.

References

Bibliography

 

Chaco Canyon
Chaco Culture National Historical Park
Colorado Plateau
Geography of New Mexico
Arroyos and washes of the United States